At least five warships of Russia have borne the name Admiral Nakhimov, in honour of Pavel Nakhimov an admiral of the Imperial Russian Navy.

 , an armoured cruiser launched in 1885.
 , a light cruiser launched in 1915, name ship of her class, she was renamed Chervona Ukraina by the Soviets.
 , a  launched in 1951.
 , a  launched in 1969.
Launched in 1986, she was originally named Kalinin.

See also
 , a class of Russian cruisers constructed in the early 20th century.
 , a former German passenger ship initially launched in 1925 as SS Berlin III and salvaged by the Soviet Union in 1949; collided with a cargo ship in 1986 and sank in the Tsemes Bay near Novorossiysk.

Russian Navy ship names